The mouflon (Ovis gmelini) is a wild sheep native to Cyprus, the Caspian region from eastern Turkey, Armenia, Azerbaijan, and Iran. It is thought to be the ancestor of all modern domestic sheep breeds.

Taxonomy
Ovis gmelini was the scientific name proposed by Edward Blyth in 1841 for wild sheep in the Middle East.
In the 19th and 20th centuries, several wild sheep were described that are considered mouflon subspecies today:
 Ovis ophion by Blyth in 1841 for wild sheep in Cyprus;
 Ovis laristanica by Nikolai Nasonov in 1909 for wild sheep in Lar in southern Iran;
 Ovis orientalis isphahanica by Nasonov in 1910 for wild sheep in the Zagros Mountains.

Subspecies 
Five mouflon subspecies of are distinguished by MSW3:
 Armenian mouflon (Armenian red sheep), O. g. gmelini (Blyth, 1851): nominate subspecies; native to northwestern Iran, Armenia, and Azerbaijan. It has been introduced to Texas in the U.S.
 Esfahan mouflon, O. g. isphahanica (Nasonov, 1910): Zagros Mountains, Iran.
 Laristan mouflon, O. g. laristanica (Nasonov, 1909): a small subspecies, its range is restricted to some desert reserves near Lar in southern Iran.
 Cyprus mouflon, O. g. ophion (Blyth, 1841): also called agrino (from the Greek ); nearly driven to extinction during the 20th century. In 1997, about 1,200 individuals were counted. The television show Born to Explore with Richard Wiese reported 3,000 individuals on Cyprus.

The European mouflon was once thought to be a subspecies of the mouflon, but is now considered to be a feral descendant of the domestic sheep (Ovis aries), as Ovis aries musimon.

Relation to other sheep
Based on comparison of mitochondrial cytochrome b gene sequences, three groups of sheep (Ovis) have been identified: Pachyceriforms of Siberia (snow sheep) and North America (bighorn and Dall sheep), Argaliforms (argali) of Central Asia, and Moufloniforms (urial, mouflon, and domestic sheep) of Eurasia.  However, a comparison of the mitochondrial DNA control region (CR) found that two subspecies of urial, Ovis vignei (or orientalis) arkal and O. v./o. bochariensis, grouped with two different clades of argali (Ovis ammon).

The ancestral sheep is presumed to have had 60 chromosomes, as in goats (Capra).  Mouflon and domestic sheep have 54 chromosomes, with three pairs (1+3, 2+8, 5+11) of ancestral acrocentric chromosomes joined to form bi-armed chromosomes.  This is in contrast to the argali and urial, which have 56 and 58 chromosomes respectively.  If the urial is as closely related to the mouflons as mitochondrial DNA indicates, then two chromosomes would need to have split during its evolution away from the mouflon (sub)species.

Description

Mouflon has reddish to dark brown, short-haired coats with dark back stripes and black ventral areas and light-colored saddle patches. The males are horned; some females are horned, while others are polled.  The horns of mature rams are curved almost one full revolution (up to 85 cm). Mouflon have shoulder heights of around 0.9 m and body weights of 50 kg (males) and 35 kg (females).

Distribution and habitat
Mouflon are found in the Lesser Caucasus in southeastern Turkey, Armenia and Azerbaijan, and in Iran's western Alborz region and the Zagros Mountains spanning across eastern Iraq and western Iran. It was possibly introduced to Cyprus during the Neolithic period.

Behaviour and ecology

Reproduction 
Mouflon rams have a strict dominance hierarchy. Before mating season or "rut", which is from late autumn to early winter, rams try to create a dominance hierarchy to determine access to ewes (female mouflon) for mating. Mouflon rams fight one another to obtain dominance and win an opportunity to mate with females. Mouflons reach sexual maturity at the age of 2 to 4 years. Young rams need to obtain dominance before they get a chance to mate, which takes another 3 years for them to start mating. Mouflon ewes also go through a similar hierarchy process in terms of social status in the first 2 years, but can breed even at low status. Pregnancy in females lasts 5 months, in which they produce one to two offspring.

A mouflon was cloned successfully in early 2001, and lived at least seven months, making it the first clone of an endangered mammal to survive beyond infancy. This demonstrated that a common species (in this case, a domestic sheep) can successfully become a surrogate for the birth of an exotic animal such as the mouflon. If cloning of the mouflon can proceed successfully, it has the potential to reduce strain on the number of living specimens.

Conservation 
The mouflon is protected in Armenia and Azerbaijan. In Turkey and Iran, hunting is only allowed with a special license. The population in Cyprus is listed as a strictly protected species in the Habitats Directive of the European Union and has been listed in CITES Appendix I since November 2019.

In culture

In Sardinia, the male is called Murvoni, and the female Murva, though it is not unusual to hear the peasants style both indiscriminately Mufion, which is a palpable corruption of the Greek Ophion.
 The mouflon was the logo of Cyprus Airways until 2015, and is depicted on the 1-, 2-, and 5-cent Cypriot euro coins.
 The mouflon is featured on the historical flag of the Armenian kingdom of Syunik, and on tombstones.
 The mouflon is the symbol and  the nickname of the Cyprus national rugby union team.

See also
 Castlemilk Moorit
 Urial

References 

Ovis
Mammals of Azerbaijan
Mammals of the Middle East
Mammals of Turkey
Caucasus
Fauna of Iran
Mammals described in 1841
Taxa named by Edward Blyth